Second Time Around is a 2002 Hong Kong film starring Ekin Cheng, Cecilia Cheung and Ke Huy Quan. The film involves the use of parallel universes.

Plot

Ren Lee (Ekin Cheng) works at a small casino with his best friend Sing Wong (Ke Huy Quan). Ren gets dumped by his pregnant fiancée and asks Sing for money to gamble in Las Vegas, believing himself to have the strongest luck after his fiancée fired a pistol at him and missed all six times.

In Vegas, Sing wanders around the casino while Ren is gambling and offers advice to a young woman that helps her win big. Casino management becomes suspicious of Ren’s winnings and send their best dealer, Number One, to deal with him. Ren loses all his money to Number One and leaves the casino with Sing. The young woman who Sing helped win at the casino sees the two leaving and offers them a ride.

Both his best friend and the woman die in a car accident. Ren is the sole survivor. Ren, now pursued by policewoman Tina Chow (Cecilia Cheung), gets into another car accident that causes them to go back in time. Through this process, he not only changes himself and saves his friend's life but also falls in love with Tina.

Cast
 Ekin Cheng as Ren Lee
 Cecilia Cheung as Tina Chow
 Ke Huy Quan as Sing Wong (as Jonathan Ke Quan)
 Annamarie Ameera as Anna
 Oliver Tan as Paul
 John Wang as Det. Luca
 Alexander Fung as Jesus (Number One)
 Johnny Koo as Bobby
 Lynne Langdon as Bo Bo
 Glen Pon as David
 David Quan as Man in Jail

Awards
The film won the Film of Merit prize at the 2003 Hong Kong Film Critics Society Awards.

References

External links 
 
 

2000s Cantonese-language films
2002 films
Hong Kong science fiction films
China Star Entertainment Group films
Milkyway Image films
Films directed by Jeffrey Lau
Films set in the United States
2000s Hong Kong films